In microanatomy, the central veins of liver (or central venules) are veins found at the center of hepatic lobules (one vein at each lobule center).

They receive the blood mixed in the liver sinusoids and return it to circulation via the hepatic veins.

The circulation of venous blood is: portal vein (which is formed by the joining of the superior mesenteric vein with the splenic vein) drains into the sinusoids of the liver, these all drain into the central veins of liver which drain into the hepatic vein to be returned to IVC.

References

External links
 
 Histology at okstate.edu
 Histology at ntu.edu.tw
 Diagrams at vanderbilt.edu

Veins of the torso
Liver anatomy